Roque Mercury Barrial (born September 8, 1938 in Argentina) is a former Argentine footballer and former football manager who played for clubs of Chile and Colombia and coached in clubs of Chile. He is a naturalized Chilean and based in Santiago, the capital of Chile.

Teams (Player)
  Deportes Tolima 1957-1958
  Atlético Bucaramanga 1959
  Deportes Tolima 1960-1961
  San Luis de Quillota 1962
  Universidad Técnica del Estado 1963
  Deportes La Serena 1964

Teams (Coach)
  Audax Italiano 1982
  Green Cross 1984
  Curicó Unido 1986
  Deportes Temuco 1987
  San Luis de Quillota 1989
  Deportes Temuco 1990
  San Antonio Unido 1992
  Santiago Wanderers 1992
  Deportes Temuco 1997
  Deportes Temuco 2001-2002

External links
 

1938 births
Living people
Chilean Primera División managers
Deportes Temuco managers
Argentine emigrants to Chile
Argentine footballers
Argentine expatriate footballers
Argentine football managers
Atlético Bucaramanga footballers
Deportes Tolima footballers
Deportes La Serena footballers
San Luis de Quillota footballers
Categoría Primera A players
Chilean Primera División players
Primera B de Chile players
Expatriate footballers in Chile
Expatriate footballers in Colombia
Expatriate football managers in Chile
Naturalized citizens of Chile
Audax Italiano managers

Association footballers not categorized by position